Eva flexa is a moth in the family Geometridae. It is found in China (Tibet and Yunnan).

The forewings are dark olive-brown with well marked medial and postmedial lines. There is a large discal dot and there are orange discal and substernal streaks.

References

Moths described in 1981
Eupitheciini